Mycobacterium virus Packman is a bacteriophage known to infect bacterial species of the genus Mycobacterium. It is named after the famed arcade game character Pac-Man, from the game of the same name.

References

Siphoviridae
Mycobacteriophages